Shad Mianeh (also Romanized as Shād Mīāneh; also known as Shād Mehneh) is a village in Darbqazi Rural District, in the Central District of Nishapur County, Razavi Khorasan Province, Iran. At the 2006 census, its population was 273, in 83 families.

References 

Populated places in Nishapur County